The 2003 NCAA Women's Division I Swimming and Diving Championships were contested at the 22nd annual NCAA-sanctioned swim meet to determine the team and individual national champions of Division I women's collegiate swimming and diving in the United States. 

This year's events were hosted by Auburn University at the James E. Martin Aquatics Center in Auburn, Alabama.

Defending champions Auburn once again topped the team standings, finishing 163 points ahead of Georgia. This was the Tigers' second women's team title.

Team standings
Note: Top 10 only
(H) = Hosts
(DC) = Defending champions
Full results

See also
List of college swimming and diving teams

References

NCAA Division I Swimming And Diving Championships
NCAA Division I Swimming And Diving Championships
NCAA Division I Women's Swimming and Diving Championships